In the geometry of hyperbolic 3-space, the cubic-octahedral honeycomb is a compact uniform honeycomb, constructed from cube, octahedron, and cuboctahedron cells, in a rhombicuboctahedron vertex figure. It has a single-ring Coxeter diagram, and is named by its two regular cells.

Images
Wide-angle perspective views:

It contains a subgroup H2 tiling, the alternated order-4 hexagonal tiling, with vertex figure (3.4)4.

Symmetry
A lower symmetry form, index 6, of this honeycomb can be constructed with [(4,3,4,3*)] symmetry, represented by a trigonal trapezohedron fundamental domain, and Coxeter diagram .

Related honeycombs

Rectified cubic-octahedral honeycomb 

The rectified cubic-octahedral honeycomb is a compact uniform honeycomb, constructed from cuboctahedron and rhombicuboctahedron cells, in a cuboid vertex figure. It has a Coxeter diagram .

Perspective view from center of rhombicuboctahedron

Cyclotruncated cubic-octahedral honeycomb 

The cyclotruncated cubic-octahedral honeycomb is a compact uniform honeycomb, constructed from truncated cube and octahedron cells, in a square antiprism vertex figure. It has a Coxeter diagram .

Perspective view from center of octahedron

It can be seen as somewhat analogous to the trioctagonal tiling, which has truncated square and triangle facets:

Cyclotruncated octahedral-cubic honeycomb 

The cyclotruncated octahedral-cubic honeycomb is a compact uniform honeycomb, constructed from cube and truncated octahedron cells, in a triangular antiprism vertex figure. It has a Coxeter diagram .

Perspective view from center of cube

It contains an H2 subgroup tetrahexagonal tiling alternating square and hexagonal faces, with Coxeter diagram  or half symmetry :

Symmetry

A radial subgroup symmetry, index 6, of this honeycomb can be constructed with [(4,3,4,3*)], represented by a trigonal trapezohedron fundamental domain, and Coxeter diagram .

Truncated cubic-octahedral honeycomb 

The truncated cubic-octahedral honeycomb is a compact uniform honeycomb, constructed from truncated octahedron, truncated cube, rhombicuboctahedron, and truncated cuboctahedron cells, in a rectangular pyramid vertex figure. It has a Coxeter diagram .

Perspective view from center of rhombicuboctahedron

Omnitruncated cubic-octahedral honeycomb 

The omnitruncated cubic-octahedral honeycomb is a compact uniform honeycomb, constructed from truncated cuboctahedron cells, in a rhombic disphenoid vertex figure. It has a Coxeter diagram  with [2,2]+ (order 4) extended symmetry in its rhombic disphenoid vertex figure.

Perspective view from center of truncated cuboctahedron

See also 
 Convex uniform honeycombs in hyperbolic space
 List of regular polytopes

References 
Coxeter, Regular Polytopes, 3rd. ed., Dover Publications, 1973. . (Tables I and II: Regular polytopes and honeycombs, pp. 294–296)
Coxeter, The Beauty of Geometry: Twelve Essays, Dover Publications, 1999  (Chapter 10: Regular honeycombs in hyperbolic space, Summary tables II,III,IV,V, p212-213)
 Jeffrey R. Weeks The Shape of Space, 2nd edition  (Chapter 16-17: Geometries on Three-manifolds I,II)
 Norman Johnson Uniform Polytopes, Manuscript
 N.W. Johnson: The Theory of Uniform Polytopes and Honeycombs, Ph.D. Dissertation, University of Toronto, 1966 
 N.W. Johnson: Geometries and Transformations, (2018) Chapter 13: Hyperbolic Coxeter groups

Honeycombs (geometry)